
Gmina Trzciana is a rural gmina (administrative district) in Bochnia County, Lesser Poland Voivodeship, in southern Poland.

Villages
Gmina Trzciana contains the villages and settlements of Kamionna, Kierlikówka, Łąkta Dolna, Leszczyna, Rdzawa, Trzciana and Ujazd.

Neighbouring gminas
Gmina Trzciana is bordered by the gminas of Łapanów, Limanowa, Nowy Wiśnicz and Żegocina.

References
Polish official population figures 2006

Trzciana
Bochnia County